Marko Ristić (Serbian Cyrillic: Марко Ристић; born 9 March 1987) is a Serbian footballer who  plays for NK Tabor Sežana.

External links

1987 births
Living people
Serbian footballers
Association football fullbacks
FK Mladi Radnik players
FK Radnički 1923 players
FK Smederevo players
FK Sloboda Užice players
FK Slavija Sarajevo players
FK Jagodina players
NK Tabor Sežana players
Serbian SuperLiga players
Premier League of Bosnia and Herzegovina players
Slovenian PrvaLiga players
Serbian expatriate footballers
Serbian expatriate sportspeople in Bosnia and Herzegovina
Serbian expatriate sportspeople in Slovenia
Expatriate footballers in Bosnia and Herzegovina
Expatriate footballers in Slovenia